N-Acetyltryptamine is an organic compound with the molecular formula C12H14N2O. It is a partial agonist for the melatonin receptors. N-Acetyltryptamine is produced by Streptomyces djakartensis and other Streptomyces and Fusarium species.

References

Further reading 

 

 organic compounds
Acetamides
Tryptamines